The Glamorgan County Silver Ball Trophy (also known as the Glamorgan County High Motive Silver Ball Trophy) is a Welsh rugby union competition open to all non-premier Welsh Rugby Union (WRU) clubs playing in the Glamorgan area.

History
The Silver Ball competition was suggested by Glamorgan County president Glan Williams in 1955. The first tournament took place in 1956 when J. Norman Hunt volunteered to meet the costs. It was open to all 64 WRU clubs in the Glamorgan region. The Silver Ball Trophy was made by Birmingham-based trophy maker Thomas Fattorini Ltd and cost £100 to produce. The idea was to match eight junior teams against the county's eight first class sides, but a poor response from the senior teams resulted in the Welsh Academicals being drafted in to make a realistic quarter finals.

The tournament also produces the SA Brains trophy which is awarded to the team to have scored the most tries during the buildup to the final. This team is then invited to play the Silver Ball winners in a pre-season friendly for the President's Cup.

The trophy is sponsored by Chemical Corporation.(since season 2019/20

Silver Ball Trophy finals

Competition multiple winners
Five Wins
 Glynneath RFC

Four wins
Tondu RFC

Three wins
Bridgend Sports RFC 
Tonmawr RFC

Two wins
Aberavon Quins RFC 
Abercynon RFC 
Cardiff Athletic 
Cilfynydd RFC
Gilfach Goch RFC
Glamorgan Wanderers RFC 
Llantrisant RFC
Llantwit Major RFC
Maesteg Harlequins RFC 
Penallta RFC
Pyle RFC
Senghenydd RFC
UWIC RFC
Ynysybwl  RFC

References

Bibliography
 

Rugby union competitions in Wales
Sport in Glamorgan